Michael Jackson: On the Wall was an exhibition that explored the influence of Michael Jackson on some of the contemporary art's leading names. The exhibition included contemporary artists’ interpretations of Michael Jackson in over 100 works of art. The featured 48 artists spanned several generations across all media. The list includes established international artists like Andy Warhol and Isa Genzken, to Kehinde Wiley and Jordan Wolfson. National Portrait Gallery partnered with the  Michael Jackson Estate to produce the exhibition. Dr. Nicholas Cullinan is the show's director. Private collectors from around the world loaned the art pieces for the show, which also includes new works made especially for Michael Jackson: On the Wall.

What would have been Michael Jackson's 60th birthday in the summer of 2018, marked the opening of the exhibition. The exhibition toured various European cities like London, Paris, and Bundeskunsthalle in Bonn and EMMA. The Embassy of the United States in Helsinki, the Romanian Cultural Institute in Stockholm, and the Embassies of Romania and Finland have all supported the exhibition that also included hardcover catalog with essays by Margo Jefferson, Zadie Smith, and Nicholas Cullinan.

Michael Jackson: On the Wall exhibition ranks second on the list of most popular exhibitions throughout EMMA's history, when comparing the total amount of visitors.

References

External links

Cultural depictions of Michael Jackson
Pop art
Black people in art
Portrait art